The 1988 Cal State Northridge  Matadors football team represented California State University, Northridge as a member of the Western Football Conference (WFC) during the 1988 NCAA Division II football season. Led by third-year head coach Bob Burt, Cal State Northridge compiled an overall record of 6–5 with a mark of 2–4 in conference play, tying for fifth place in the WFC. The team outscored its opponents 269 to 268 for the season. The Matadors played home games at North Campus Stadium in Northridge, California.

Schedule

References

Cal State Northridge
Cal State Northridge Matadors football seasons
Cal State Northridge Matadors football